Psilocorsis argyropasta is a moth in the family Depressariidae. It was described by Walsingham in 1912. It is found in Mexico (Veracruz, Guerrero).

The wingspan is about 14 mm. The forewings are pale fawn-ochreous, striated with brown. The termen is narrowly dark brown, breaking into spots near the apex. The hindwings are greyish-ochreous, with a narrow brownish marginal line.

References

Moths described in 1912
Psilocorsis